Darood can mean:

Darod, a Somali clan.
Durood, a phrase complimenting Muhammad